Ōtani, Otani or Ohtani may refer to:

 Ōtani (surname), a Japanese surname
 Ōtani University, a private Buddhist university in Kita-ku, Kyoto, Japan
 Ōtani-ha, a branch of the Jōdo Shinshū school of Pure Land Buddhism
 The House of Ōtani, family of the descendants of Shinran, founder of Jōdo Shinshū

See also
 New Otani Art Museum